Liquid is a collaborative EP by American rapper/producer Le1f and producer Boody, released on November 19, 2012.

Track listing

References

External links
Liquid on Discogs
Liquid on iTunes

2012 EPs
Leif (rapper) albums
Collaborative albums